Talitha kum, Talitha kumi, or Talitha cumi may refer to:

 A phrase from the story of the raising of Jairus' daughter; see 
 Talitha Kum, an international network of Catholic nuns against human trafficking
 Talitha Koumi Church, Bangladesh; see Christianity in Bangladesh
 Talitha Kumi School, Beit Jala, West Bank, Palestinian territories
 "Talitha Cumi" (The X-Files), the season finale of the third season of The X-Files

See also
 Talitha (disambiguation)
 Talitha Qumi, a Romanian progressive rock band
 Talitha Cummins, Australian journalist